Kipori Jermaine Woods (born in Houston, Texas September 4, 1971), also known by stage name Kipori 'Baby Wolf' Woods, is an Actor, American singer, songwriter and guitarist raised in New Orleans, Louisiana, United States. He has played gospel, blues, jazz, funk and rap music and plays a blend of these music genres. Woods is the grandson of band-leader and blues bass player 'Luscious' Lloyd Lambert. Woods began singing gospel and playing guitar as a young child, he has played professionally since the 1990s.

Life and career
Kipori grew up in New Orleans, raised by his grandfather Lloyd Lambert (June 1928-October 1995).  Woods performed with the gospel choirs the Zion Harmonizers and Raymond Miles aged 12. He went on to learn about life as a musician on the road as a young teenager touring with his grandfather, Luscious Lloyd Lambert, bandleader to Ray Charles, Little Richard, Danny Barker, Doc Cheatham and Guitar Slim. In his twenties, Woods played guitar for the first time in his grandfather's band the Rudulph Brothers

Kipori played hip hop/jazz with Kipori Funk and studied jazz at New Orleans University under Ellis Marsalis. He began playing the blues after the death of his grandfather in 1995 and was named 'Baby Wolf' when working with Walter 'Wolfman' Washington.

Kipori played in the 2004 movie Ray (film), the 2008 music video Lately (Divine song)  and from 2007-2007 he toured with the  Dirty Dozen Brass Band.

He has toured the Americas, Europe and Japan several times, sharing the stage with artists such as The Neville Brothers, Wynton, Delfeayo and Jason Marsalis, Kermit Ruffins, Walter 'Wolfman' Washington, Trombone Shorty etc. Woods has won 'Best Emerging Blues Performer' twice.

In 2012, Wood's album Blues Gone Wild was shortlisted for OffBeat 's Best Blues Album.

Discography
Bluesman from Down South,  Baby Wolf Entertainment, 1999 (by Kipori Woods)
Big Black Cadillac, Louisiana Red Hot Records, 2000 (by Kipori Woods)
Back in New Orleans, Louisiana Red Hot Records,  2011 (by Kipori Woods)
Blues Gone Wild, Louisiana Red Hot Records,   2012 (by Kipori Woods)
’’Jingle Bell Blues’’,  Baby  Wolf Records,    2020   (by Kipori Woods)
’’Let’s Work Together’’,  Baby Wolf Records,  2021  (by Kipori Woods)

Film and television
Bernie Cyress Show
After Midnight
Louisiana Jukebox
’’Ray’’
’’One Night In Miami’’

References

1971 births
Living people
African-American guitarists
American blues guitarists
American blues singers
American funk guitarists
American male guitarists
American rhythm and blues guitarists
Blues musicians from New Orleans
Contemporary blues musicians
Rhythm and blues musicians from New Orleans
Singers from Louisiana
Guitarists from Louisiana
21st-century American guitarists
21st-century African-American male singers